Three naval vessels of Japan have been named Mizuho:

 Japanese seaplane carrier Mizuho, commissioned into Imperial Japanese Navy on 1939 and sunk on 2 May 1942 by USS Drum.
 Japanese patrol vessel Mizuho (PLH-41), commissioned into Japan Coast Guard on 22 August 2019.

Imperial Japanese Navy ship names
Japanese Navy ship names